Damir Sharipzyanov (born 17 February 1996) is a Russian professional ice hockey defenseman for Avangard Omsk of the Kontinental Hockey League (KHL).

Playing career
On 8 May 2020, Sharipzyanov left hometown club, HC Neftekhimik Nizhnekamsk after three seasons, signing a new three-year contract as a free agent with fellow KHL club Avangard Omsk.

International play

On 23 January 2022, Sharipzyanov was named to the roster to represent Russian Olympic Committee athletes at the 2022 Winter Olympics.

Career statistics

Regular season and playoffs

International

Awards and honors

References

External links

1996 births
Living people
Avangard Omsk players
Manchester Monarchs (ECHL) players
HC Neftekhimik Nizhnekamsk players
Ontario Reign (AHL) players
Owen Sound Attack players
Ice hockey players at the 2022 Winter Olympics
Russian ice hockey defencemen
Medalists at the 2022 Winter Olympics
Olympic silver medalists for the Russian Olympic Committee athletes
Olympic medalists in ice hockey
Olympic ice hockey players of Russia